Ariadhoo Kandu is the channel between Alif Atoll and Faafu Atoll located in the Maldives.

References
 Divehiraajjege Jōgrafīge Vanavaru. Muhammadu Ibrahim Lutfee. G.Sōsanī.

Channels of the Maldives
Channels of the Indian Ocean